The Dutch Athletics Championships is an annual outdoor track and field competition organised by the Royal Dutch Athletics Federation, which serves as the national championship for the sport in the Netherlands. It is typically held as a two- or three-day event in the Dutch summer, ranging from late June to early August. The venue of the championships varies, though Amsterdam's Olympic Stadium has been a regular host.

Established in 1910 as a men-only competition, the programme expanded to include women's events in 1921.

Events
The current track and field programme features a total of 38 individual Dutch Championship athletics events, divided evenly between the sexes.

Track running
100 metres, 200 metres, 400 metres, 800 metres, 1500 metres, 5000 metres, 10,000 metres
Obstacle events
100 metres hurdles (women only), 110 metres hurdles (men only), 400 metres hurdles, 3000 metres steeplechase
Jumping events
Pole vault, high jump, long jump, triple jump
Throwing events
Shot put, discus throw, javelin throw, hammer throw
Combined events
Decathlon (men only), heptathlon (women only)

Men competed in the 200 metres hurdles up to the 1978 championships and women competed in that discipline in 1973 only. On some occasions, national club competitions in 4 × 100 metres relay and 4 × 400 metres relay are contested at the national championships.

The women's programme expanded inline with international acceptance of women's athletics. The women's 1500 metres was added in 1967 and 3000 metres followed in 1974 (and remained on the programme up to 1994). The 80 metres hurdles was held until 1968, after which it was replaced by the international standard 100 metres hurdles. A women's 400 m hurdles was first held in 1976. The last women's pentathlon was contested in 1980 and was then replaced by the new heptathlon event. The women's equivalents of the men's standard 5000 m and 10,000 m were added in 1981. Later additions to the women's programme were triple jump (1991), pole vault and hammer throw (1995) and the steeplechase (2002) – the final addition bringing women to parity of events in track and field.

Dutch championships in cross country running, racewalking, the half marathon, marathon, 100 kilometres run and 24-hour run are all conducted separately.

Editions

Championship records

Men

Women

See also
List of Dutch records in athletics

References

 
Athletics competitions in the Netherlands
National athletics competitions
Recurring sporting events established in 1910
1910 establishments in the Netherlands